Laura: Shadows of a Summer is a 1979 French erotic romantic drama film directed by photographer David Hamilton. It stars Dawn Dunlap as the title character. Hamilton made a cameo appearance in the film.

Plot
Paul Wyler is a successful sculptor best known for sculpting nude young girls. When he encounters an old flame, Sarah, he is so smitten by her beautiful daughter Laura that he asks Sarah if she will pose for him. Sarah, married but still jealous of the fact that her former lover is more attracted to her daughter, tells Paul that Laura is not interested, even though she is actually quite enthusiastic about doing it. As an alternative to live posing, Sarah takes photos of Laura posing nude and gives them to Paul so that he can sculpt Laura. After a fire at an art exhibit, Paul goes blind and cannot complete the sculpture. In the end, Laura, when going to say goodbye to Paul, allows him to finish his work by feeling her body and sculpting by feeling. This leads to a sexual encounter between the two, and the next morning Laura's mother comes to take her away.

Cast

Production
The film is shot in the same soft focus style that is common of David Hamilton's photography and his other films.

Companion book
In 1979, Hamilton released a portfolio tie-in with the film, titled Shadows of a Summer.

External links

References

1979 films
1979 romantic drama films
1970s erotic drama films
1970s French-language films
Erotic romance films
Films directed by David Hamilton
French erotic drama films
French romantic drama films
1970s French films